Royal King was an outstanding cutting stallion and Quarter horse sire from the early days of the American Quarter Horse Association (or AQHA).

Life

Royal King was a 1943 sorrel stallion registered with the AQHA as number 2392. He was bred by Felton Smathers of Llano, Texas and owned at the time of registration by Whiteside and Albin of Sipe Springs, Texas. His sire was King P-234 and his dam was a mare named Rocket Laning that was eventually registered with the AQHA as number 39,024. She was sired by Dolph, and out of an unregistered mare named Cricket sired by Coldy. Rocket Laning was a double descendant of Yellow Jacket, so Royal King had three lines to Yellow Jacket, since King also traced once to Yellow Jacket.

Show career 
In his show career, he earned a Performance Register of Merit and a Superior Cutting Horse award from the AQHA. With the National Cutting Horse Association (or NCHA) he earned $24,003.19 in cutting competition, entitling him to a NCHA Certificate of Ability, and Bronze and Silver awards.

Breeding record 
He sired, among others, Miss Nancy Bailey, Major King, Royal Chess, Royal Jazzy, and Sketer Conway. Three of his daughters produced offspring that earned a Race Register of Merit with the AQHA. His offspring Miss Nancy Bailey and Royal Chess were inducted into the NCHA Horse Hall of Fame. Miss Nancy Bailey was the 1952 and 1953 AQHA High Point Cutting Horse, and Royal Lightning was the 1963 AQHA High Point Western Pleasure Stallion. Royal Chess was the Youth AQHA World Champion Cutting Horse.

Death and honors 
He died in 1971 and was inducted into the AQHA Hall of Fame in 1997.

Pedigree

Notes

References

 All Breed Pedigree Database Pedigree of Royal King retrieved on June 26, 2007
 AQHA Hall of Fame accessed on September 2, 2017
 American Quarter Horse Association Official Stud Book and Registry Combined Books 1-2-3-4-5 Amarillo, Texas:American Quarter Horse Association 1961
 Earnings for Royal King retrieved in September 2017
 NCHA Horse Hall of Fame retrieved on September 4, 2017
 Pitzer, Andrea Laycock The Most Influential Quarter Horse Sires Tacoma, Washington:Premier Publishing 1987
 Swan, Kathy ed. Legends 3:Outstanding Quarter Horse Stallions and Mares Colorado Springs:Western Horseman 1997
 Wagoner, Dan Quarter Horse Reference 1974 Edition Grapevine, Texas:Equine Research 1974
 Wagoner, Dan Quarter Racing Digest: 1940 to 1976 Grapevine, Texas:Equine Research 1976

External links
 Royal King at Quarter Horse Directory
 Royal King at Quarter Horse Legends

Cutting horses
American Quarter Horse sires
1943 animal births
AQHA Hall of Fame (horses)